Tremaine Edward Kennedy (January 3, 1888 – April 13, 1934) was a Canadian professional ice hockey player. He played with the Cobalt Silver Kings of the National Hockey Association.

References

1888 births
1934 deaths
Canadian ice hockey players
Cobalt Silver Kings players
Ice hockey people from New Brunswick
Sportspeople from Moncton